The 1904 United States presidential election in Maine took place on November 8, 1904, as part of the 1904 United States presidential election. Voters chose six representatives, or electors to the Electoral College, who voted for president and vice president.

Maine overwhelmingly voted for the Republican nominee, President Theodore Roosevelt, over the Democratic nominee, former Chief Judge of New York Court of Appeals Alton B. Parker. Roosevelt won Maine by a margin of 38.95%.

Results

Results by county

See also
 United States presidential elections in Maine

References

Maine
1904
1904 Maine elections